Oscar Yuston (born 14 February 1939) is an Argentine sports shooter. He competed in the men's 25 metre rapid fire pistol event at the 1976 Summer Olympics.

References

1939 births
Living people
Argentine male sport shooters
Olympic shooters of Argentina
Shooters at the 1976 Summer Olympics
Place of birth missing (living people)
Pan American Games medalists in shooting
Pan American Games gold medalists for Argentina
Pan American Games silver medalists for Argentina
Shooters at the 1975 Pan American Games
Shooters at the 1979 Pan American Games